The Carson College of Business is the business school of Washington State University in Pullman, Washington. Established in 1963, it is one of the largest of the ten colleges in WSU.

History
The College of Business first offered economics courses since Washington State University started operating in 1892. The Department of Economic Science and History was created in 1917 as part of the College of Sciences and Arts, and in 1926, it became the Department of Business Administration. The department started offering programs in Secretarial Science, apart from the normal offering of economics courses, which is at that time composed of only five faculty members.

In 1928, the Department of Business Administration was elevated to school status and the faculty grew to fifteen members. However, it was incorporated with the College of Sciences and Arts until it received independent status in 1940. 
In 1948, the Economics department from the College of Sciences and Arts and the School of Business Administration merged, becoming the School of Economics and Business with the help of Dr. M. W. Lee.

In 1963, the school was granted college status and became the College of Business and Economics. The first functioning dean was Dr. Eugene Clark. The college first offered business courses with the establishment of three branch campuses of Washington State University in Tri-Cities, Spokane and Vancouver in 1989. The School of Economics Sciences is now part of College of Agricultural, Human, and Natural Resource Sciences which offers courses in economics.

In 2006, the Washington State University Regents voted to change the college's name to the College of Business.

Departments
WSU College of Business is divided into various units:
Department of Accounting 
Department of Management, Information Systems, and Entrepreneurship 
Department of Marketing and International Business
Department of Finance and Management Science 
Graduate Programs
International Business Institute  
School of Hospitality Business Management

Academics

The College of Business offers undergraduate and graduate programs at three Washington State University campuses in Pullman, Tri-Cities and Vancouver.The college is accredited by the Association to Advance Collegiate Schools of Business (AACSB).

International programs
In addition, the College of Business provides degree programs, internships, study abroad and faculty-led programs in Australia, China, Greece, Italy, Korea, Spain, Turkey, Tanzania, Switzerland, and Thailand.

Partnership with Cesar Ritz Colleges Switzerland
The WSU College of Business and the Cesar Ritz Colleges Switzerland have a partnership that confer two degrees from both institutions, a bachelor's degree in Hospitality Business Management from WSU College of Business and a bachelor's degree in International Business from Cesar Ritz Colleges. The three-year program allows students to earn two degrees with an extensive global business position and two six-month internships in Switzerland. Nearly 1,000 students have earned a Washington State University degree through César Ritz Colleges since its inception in 1984.

International Business Institute
WSU offers more than 1,200 education abroad opportunities. To date, the College of Business offers the following study abroad programs:

Faculty-led Programs

Semester Programs at International Centers
Business in Switzerland, César Ritz Colleges
Business in China, Southwestern University of Finance and Economics (SWUFE)

Summer Programs
Business in Australia, CAPA Sydney Program
Business in Greece, University of Crete
Business in Korea, Korea University
Business in Northern Thailand, Chiang Mai University
Business in Spain, Universitat Politècnica de València
Business in Tanzania, The Nelson Mandela African Institute of Science and Technology
Food and Wine of Italy, Apicius International School of Hospitality
Hospitality Experience in Phuket, Thailand, The Tropical Garden Resort

Facilities
Facilities include:

Atrium Cafe 
College of Business Copy Center 
E-Commerce Computer Classroom
Finance and Management Science Classroom 
Financial Markets Trading Room 
Graduate Suite
College of Business Atrium Display Gallery
Technology Classroom
Wine Business Management Classroom

Centers and institutes
WSU College of Business hosts numerous centers and institutes for research activities. Centers and institutes include:

Center for Behavioral Business Research
Center for Entrepreneurial Studies 
Innovation Assessment Center 
J Willard and Alice S. Marriott Foundation Hospitality Teaching Center
Carson Center for Student Success 
WSU Economic Development Administration University Center
Howard D. and B. Phyllis Hoops Institute of Taxation Research and Policy
International Business Institute
Granger Cobb Institute for Senior Living

References

External links

Washington State University
Business schools in Washington (state)
Educational institutions established in 1963
1963 establishments in Washington (state)